Abkhazia–South Ossetia relations  are bilateral foreign relations between the Republic of Abkhazia and the Republic of South Ossetia, whose international status is disputed – they are both considered part of Georgia by the majority of the world's states.

Abkhazia and South Ossetia recognized each other's independence by signing of treaty of friendship and cooperation or before.

On 19 September 2005, a day before the 15th anniversary of South Ossetia's independence, President Sergei Bagapsh of Abkhazia and President Eduard Kokoity of South Ossetia signed a treaty of friendship and cooperation in Tskhinvali. The treaty was ratified by South Ossetia's Parliament on 27 December and by Abkhazia's Parliament on 15 February 2006. On 20 September, Kokoity awarded Bagapsh with the Medal of Honour.

Diplomatic relations between both countries were established on 26 September 2007.

In recent years, the governments of Abkhazia and South Ossetia have been working closely together in search of more international recognition. The leaders of Abkhazia and South Ossetia have also signed a mutual defense pact, stating that in case either country is attacked, the other must become involved in the other's defense. During the 2008 South Ossetia war, Abkhazian soldiers and volunteers backed by Russian paratroopers drove Georgian troops from their last stronghold in Abkhazia's Kodori Valley while Russian and South Ossetian forces were engaged in heavy combat with Georgian forces.

On 18 August 2015, Abkhazia and South Ossetia signed an agreement on visa-free travel during a visit by Abkhazia's Foreign Minister Viacheslav Chirikba to Tskhinvali. Both states are members of the Community for Democracy and Rights of Nations.

Ambassadors
On 26 September 2007, South Ossetia's first ambassador to Abkhazia Robert Kokoity presented his credentials to Abkhazia's President Sergei Bagapsh. On 15 April 2008 South Ossetia's chancery in Abkhazia's capital Sukhumi was formally opened. On 10 December December 2010, President Kokoity accepted the credentials of Nodar Pliev, the ambassador of Abkhazia to South Ossetia. After succeeding Eduard Kokoity as President of South Ossetia, Leonid Tibilov dismissed Robert Kokoity as Ambassador on 25 July 2012. On 15 April 2013, Oleg Botsiev was appointed as his successor. On 19 August, Botsiev presented his credentials to Abkhazian Foreign Minister Viacheslav Chirikba, and on 20 August, to President Alexander Ankvab.

On 27 January 2014, President Ankvab recalled Nodar Pliev as ambassador to South Ossetia and appointed Alan Elbakiev as his successor. Elbakiev received his credentials on 7 February and presented them to President Leonid Tibilov of South Ossetia on 28 February.

In August 2015, Abkhazia's chancery in Tskhinvali was officially inaugurated.

See also
 Foreign relations of Abkhazia
 Foreign relations of South Ossetia

References

 
South Ossetia
Bilateral relations of South Ossetia